Graška Gora is a dispersed settlement in the City Municipality of Slovenj Gradec in northern Slovenia. The area is part of the traditional region of Styria. The entire municipality is now included in the Carinthia Statistical Region.

The local church north of the settlement, in the territory of the neighbouring settlement of Šmiklavž, is dedicated to Saint Helena and belongs to the Parish of Šmiklavž. The earliest phases of the building date to the 13th century.

References

External links
Graška Gora at Geopedia

Populated places in the City Municipality of Slovenj Gradec
Slovenj Gradec